This is a list of 1037 species in the genus Forcipomyia.

Forcipomyia species

References

Forcipomyia